is a former Japanese football player. He played for Japan national team.

Club career
Hidaka was born in Tokyo on May 29, 1947. When he was a Rikkyo University student, he won the 2nd place at 1969 Emperor's Cup. This is last finalist as university team in Emperor's Cup. After graduating from Rikkyo University, he joined Nippon Steel in 1971. He retired in 1977. He played 114 games and scored 50 goals in the league.

National team career
On September 14, 1972, Hidaka debuted for Japan national team against South Korea. In 1973, he also played at 1974 World Cup qualification. He played 4 games for Japan until 1973.

National team statistics

References

External links
 
 Japan National Football Team Database

1947 births
Living people
Rikkyo University alumni
Association football people from Tokyo
Japanese footballers
Japan international footballers
Japan Soccer League players
Nippon Steel Yawata SC players
Association football forwards